Marko Antonio Cortés Mendoza (born 17 October 1977 in Zamora, Michoacán) is a Mexican politician affiliated with the National Action Party (PAN). He currently serves in the Chamber of Deputies for the LXIII Legislature of the Mexican Congress, representing the state of Michoacán and the fifth electoral region.

Personal life and education
Cortés Mendoza holds an undergraduate degree in accounting from the Universidad Michoacana de San Nicolás de Hidalgo. He began but never completed studies for a master's degree from the Instituto Tecnológico Autónomo de México.

Political career
Cortés Mendoza has been an active member of the PAN in Michoacán since 1996. He began his career in the party as its accountant in Morelia and became the state party's Secretary of Youth Action in 1998; he would serve as the national youth action coordinator for the party from 2001 to 2003, during which time he worked in the Secretariat of Social Development.

From 2003 to 2006, Cortés served his first term as a federal deputy in the LIX Legislature. He sat on commissions including Finances and Public Credit, Youth and Sports, Labor and Social Welfare, and Special on Childhood, Teens and Families.

In 2006, he was elected senator and served during the LX and LXI Legislatures. He was the secretary of the Federalism and Radio, Television, and Film Commissions, also sitting on those for Tourism, Library and Editorial Matters, and Bicameral for the Canal del Congreso.

In 2011 and 2012, Cortés ran for the municipal presidency of Morelia, losing both in the first election which was annulled and on the second attempt. In 2014, he was a precandidate for Governor of Michoacán.

The PAN returned Cortés to the Chamber of Deputies in 2015 from its fifth region list. He was the PAN's parliamentary coordinator in the Chamber of Deputies, sitting on the Political Coordination Board, and also served on the Oversight Commission for the Superior Auditor of the Federation.

References 

1977 births
Living people
National Action Party (Mexico) politicians
Members of the Chamber of Deputies (Mexico)
Members of the Senate of the Republic (Mexico)
People from Zamora, Michoacán
Politicians from Michoacán
21st-century Mexican politicians
Universidad Michoacana de San Nicolás de Hidalgo alumni